Kirriemuir Junction railway station served the burgh of Kirriemuir, Angus, Scotland from 1855 to 1864 on the Scottish Midland Junction Railway.

History 
The station opened in January 1855 by the Scottish Midland Junction Railway. To the south was a siding and south of the junction was the signal box. The only means of accessing the station was by getting off the train. It was last in the timetable in June 1864. Following the closure of this station, Kirriemuir continued to be served by the much closer Kirriemuir railway station.

References

External links 

Disused railway stations in Angus, Scotland
Railway stations in Great Britain opened in 1855
Railway stations in Great Britain closed in 1864
1855 establishments in Scotland
1864 disestablishments in Scotland